The Mordovia Cup is a professional tennis tournament played on outdoor red clay courts. It is currently part of the Association of Tennis Professionals (ATP) Challenger Tour. It is held annually in Saransk, Russia, since 2003.

Past finals

Singles

Doubles

External links
ITF Search

 
ATP Challenger Tour
Clay court tennis tournaments
Tennis tournaments in Russia
Sport in Saransk
Recurring sporting events established in 2003
2003 establishments in Russia